Matteo Brunelli (born 6 May 1994) is an Italian footballer who plays for Serie D club Prato.

Club career

Youth career
Born in Prato, Tuscany, Brunelli started his career at A.C. Pistoiese. He was a player for their under-15 team in 2008–09 season. In summer 2009 he was signed by Prato. On 30 July 2010 Brunelli moved to A.C. Milan, which he was a member of their under-17 team in 2010–11 season. He played once for Milan's reserves in the next season.

Prato
In summer 2012 Brunelli returned to Prato. He was the player of both first team and the reserves.

Carpi
On 16 January 2015 Brunelli was signed by Serie B club Carpi in a 6-month deal on a free transfer.

Chievo and loans
On 30 June 2015 Brunelli was signed by Serie A club Chievo. On 17 July 2015 he was farmed to Lega Pro club Pisa. In July 2016 Brunelli and Baldassin were farmed to Lega Pro Messina from Chievo on loan. On 1 September they left for Lupa Roma from Chievo via Messina, with Felice Gaetano moved to Messina from Napoli via Lupa Roma.

Brunelli was immediately became the first choice keeper, ahead Tomas Švedkauskas.

International career
Brunelli received a call-up from Italy national under-20 football team in October 2013. However, he did not play any game for the team.

References

External links
 Italian Footballers' Association (AIC) profile (data by football.it)  
 

1994 births
People from Prato
Sportspeople from the Province of Prato
Living people
Italian footballers
Association football goalkeepers
U.S. Pistoiese 1921 players
A.C. Prato players
A.C. Milan players
A.C. Carpi players
A.C. ChievoVerona players
Pisa S.C. players
A.C.R. Messina players
Lupa Roma F.C. players
Serie C players
Footballers from Tuscany